Prajavani (Kannada:Voice of the People) is a leading Kannada-language broadsheet daily newspaper published in Karnataka, India. Having a readership of over 2.01 million, it is one of the largest circulated newspapers in the state.

History and ownership
Prajavani was founded in 1948 in Bangalore by K.N. Guruswamy. The Printers (Mysore) Private Limited, the company which owns the newspaper, continues to be privately held by members of the founding family.

Stance
Prajavani (PV) has a history of being a politically independent newspaper, although it tends to opine with a liberal tilt. It is known for espousing the causes of Dalits, encouraging women's empowerment and taking pro-poor positions on economic issues. It has managed to maintain an independent position, despite an increasingly polarized media landscape in Karnataka. Prajavani uses the tagline "the most trusted Kannada daily newspaper", which appears below its masthead.

Position in the market
Prajavani was the leading Kannada newspaper for decades, until it was overtaken in circulation by Vijaya Karnataka (VK) in 2004. The gulf between PV and the upstart VK became huge for a while, but the two newspapers appear to be competing much more closely as of 2014, with PV having significantly recovered ground according to industry numbers. Some analysts have also attributed this to the launch of Vijaya Vani, by the original owner of Vijaya Karnataka, Vijay Sankeshwar and his VRL Group, which has apparently eaten into the readership of Vijaya Karnataka. Other regional competitors include Udayavani, Varthabharathi, Kannada Prabha and Samyukta Karnataka.

Sister publications
 Deccan Herald, a daily English newspaper
 Sudha, a Kannada weekly magazine
 Mayura, a Kannada monthly magazine

See also
 List of Kannada-language newspapers
 List of Kannada-language magazines
 List of newspapers in India
 Media in Karnataka
 Media of India

References

External links 
 
 https://web.archive.org/web/20081206111259/http://prajavaniepaper.com/
 Prajavani News Paper History
 http://mruc.net/uploads/posts/a27e6e912eedeab9ef944cc3315fba15.pdf

Kannada-language newspapers
Newspapers published in Bangalore
Publications established in 1948
1948 establishments in India